This article is a list of diseases of hops (Humulus lupulus).

Bacterial diseases

Fungal diseases

Miscellaneous diseases and disorders

Nematodes, parasitic

Virus and viroid diseases

References
Common Names of Diseases, The American Phytopathological Society

Hop
Diseases